

V04B Urine tests
Empty group

V04C Other diagnostic agents

V04CA Tests for diabetes
V04CA01 Tolbutamide
V04CA02 Glucose

V04CB Tests for fat absorption
V04CB01 Vitamin A concentrates

V04CC Tests for bile duct patency
V04CC01 Sorbitol
V04CC02 Magnesium sulfate
V04CC03 Sincalide
V04CC04 Ceruletide

V04CD Tests for pituitary function
V04CD01 Metyrapone
V04CD03 Sermorelin
V04CD04 Corticorelin
V04CD05 Somatorelin
V04CD06 Macimorelin

V04CE Tests for liver functional capacity
V04CE01 Galactose
V04CE02 Sulfobromophthalein
V04CE03 Methacetin (13C)

V04CF Tuberculosis diagnostics
V04CF01 Tuberculin

V04CG Tests for gastric secretion
V04CG01 Cation exchange resins
V04CG02 Betazole
V04CG03 Histamine phosphate
V04CG04 Pentagastrin
V04CG05 Methylthioninium chloride
V04CG30 Caffeine and sodium benzoate

V04CH Tests for renal function and ureteral injuries
V04CH01 Inulin and other polyfructosans
V04CH02 Indigo carmine
V04CH03 Phenolsulfonphthalein
V04CH04 Alsactide
V04CH30 Aminohippuric acid

V04CJ Tests for thyreoidea function
V04CJ01 Thyrotropin
V04CJ02 Protirelin

V04CK Tests for pancreatic function
V04CK01 Secretin
V04CK02 Pancreozymin (cholecystokinin)
V04CK03 Bentiromide

V04CL Tests for allergic diseases

QV04CQ Tests for mastitis

QV04CV Tests for respiratory function
QV04CV01 Lobeline

V04CM Tests for fertility disturbances
V04CM01 Gonadorelin

V04CX Other diagnostic agents
V04CX01 Indocyanine green
V04CX02 Folic acid
V04CX03 Methacholine
V04CX04 Mannitol
V04CX05 13C-urea
V04CX06 Hexaminolevulinate
V04CX07 Edrophonium
V04CX08 Carbon monoxide
V04CX09 Patent blue
V04CX10 Pafolacianine

References

V04